Ryan Joseph Sclater (born 10 February 1994) is a Canadian male volleyball player. He is a member of the Canada men's national volleyball team and French club Montpellier Volley.

Career

Club
Ryan played U Sports men's volleyball at Trinity Western University for the Spartans. During his time there, he led the Spartans to back-to-back national championships in 2016 and 2017, winning U Sports Men's Volleyball Player of the Year for the 2016-17 season. 
Following his post-secondary career, Ryan signed with German club SVG Lüneburg. He would play there for two seasons, helping the club reach the German Cup final in 2019. In May of 2019, Ryan Sclater signed for the French club Montpellier Volley

National Team
Ryan joined the senior Canadian national team in 2018, playing in both Nations League, and the World Championships. In June 2021, Sclater was named to Canada's 2020 Olympic team.

Sporting achievements

Club
 2015  CIS Men's Volleyball Championship, with Trinity Western Spartans
 2016  U Sports Men's Volleyball Championship, with Trinity Western Spartans
 2017  U Sports Men's Volleyball Championship, with Trinity Western Spartans

Individual
 2016-17 U Sports Men's Volleyball Player of the Year Award

References

External links
 
 

1994 births
Living people
Canadian men's volleyball players
Trinity Western Spartans volleyball players
Volleyball players at the 2020 Summer Olympics
Olympic volleyball players of Canada
Opposite hitters